is an arcade collectible card game in Bandai's Data Carddass line of machines, which launched on April 5, 2018. It is the successor and spin-off to the Aikatsu! and Aikatsu Stars! series of arcade games. The game revolves around using collectible cards featuring various clothes to help aspiring idols pass auditions.

An anime television adaptation by BN Pictures aired from April 5, 2018 to September 26, 2019, replacing the Aikatsu Stars! series. A manga adaptation by Chihiro Komori began serialization in Shogakukan's shōjo manga magazine Ciao from April 3, 2018. The series was followed by a spin-off title, Aikatsu on Parade! on October 5, 2019.

Plot

Aine Yūki, who is a regular student at Star Harmony Academy's normal division, meets Mio Minato from the idol division, who invites her to join Aikatsu to fulfill Aine's goal to make friends. She also befriends Maika Chōno and Ema Hinata who are also idols. Aine and Mio form a pair to become best friends to become the bright "Diamond Friends". Karen Kamishiro and Mirai Asuka are categorized as "Diamond Friends" and are in the Diamond Class!

Media

Anime

An anime television series produced by BN Pictures began airing on TV Tokyo from April 5, 2018 succeeding the Aikatsu Stars! anime series in its initial timeslot.

A second season titled "Aikatsu Friends! ~Kagayaki no Jewel~" has been announced, and it aired from April 4 to September 26, 2019, succeeding the first season of Aikatsu Friends! anime series in its initial timeslot. This was also the last installment of the Aikatsu! series to be produced in the Heisei period and the first to be produced in the Reiwa period.

Notes

References

External links
 

2018 anime television series debuts
2018 video games
Aikatsu!
Bandai Namco games
Bandai Namco Pictures
Japanese idols in anime and manga
Shogakukan manga
Shōjo manga
TV Tokyo original programming